Waldorf can have the following meanings:

People 
 William Waldorf Astor, 1st Viscount Astor (1848–1919), financier and statesman
 Waldorf Astor, 2nd Viscount Astor (1879–1952), businessman and politician
 Pappy Waldorf (1902–1981), 1966 College Football Hall of Fame inductee as a coach

Communities 
Germany
 Waldorf, Rhineland-Palatinate
 Waldorf, a district in the town of Bornheim (Rheinland), North Rhine-Westphalia
 Walldorf, a town in Baden-Württemberg

United States
 Waldorf, Maryland
 Waldorf, Minnesota

Hotels and restaurants
 Waldorf Hotel (disambiguation), hotels named Waldorf
 Waldorf–Astoria (1893–1929), the original Waldorf Astoria in New York
 Waldorf Astoria New York, in New York
 Waldorf–Astoria (disambiguation), other Waldorf-Astorias
 The Waldorf Hilton, London
 Waldorf Astoria Hotels & Resorts, a luxury hotel brand
 Waldorf System or Waldorf Lunch, a chain of lunch rooms (1903-1970s)

Education 
 Waldorf education, an educational philosophy
 Waldorf College, Forest City, Iowa, United States

Entertainment and culture 
 Waldorf Music, manufacturer of music synthesizers in Germany
 Waldorf (novel), by James Goldman
 Waldorf salad, made with apples and nuts
 Novello Theatre, theatre located in City of Westminster, England that was originally named the Waldorf Theatre

Fictional characters 
 Blair Waldorf, character in the popular novel series Gossip Girl, written by Cecily von Ziegesar
 Statler and Waldorf, a pair of Muppets